George Rowley (10 May 1896 – 8 August 1953) was an English cricketer. He played for Essex between 1926 and 1933.

References

External links

1896 births
1953 deaths
English cricketers
Essex cricketers
People from Brabourne